The Hyderabad bombings refers to the incident in which two bombs exploded almost simultaneously on 25 August 2007 in Hyderabad, capital of the Indian state of Andhra Pradesh (now Telangana). The first bomb exploded in Lumbini Amusement Park at 19:45 hrs IST. The second bomb exploded five minutes later at 19:50 in Gokul Chat Bhandar in Koti, a popular restaurant about 5 kilometres (3 mi) away. At least 42 people were reported to have died in the two bombings. Two more bombs were defused in other parts of the city. According to initial reports, the banned Harkat-ul-Jihad-al-Islami militant outfit of Bangladesh is suspected for the serial blasts.

Unexploded bombs
A day after the blasts, police discovered 19 unexploded bombs—most fitted with timers and placed in plastic bags—across Hyderabad at bus stops, by cinemas, road junctions and pedestrian bridges and near a public water fountain.

Victims
Police Commissioner of Hyderabad, Mr. Balwinder Singh, mentioned to the Press Trust of India that at least 42 people were dead and at least 54 were injured in the two attacks.

Since the blasts occurred at places popular among the general public on weekends, the victims of the blasts include people from different backgrounds and include several children and women. Among the victims were seven students from Amrutvahini College of Engineering Sangamner ( affiliated to University of Pune ) in Ahmednagar District in Maharashtra. A group of 45 students, who were visiting Hyderabad on a routine industrial tour, were enjoying a laser show at Lumbini Park when the auditorium was struck by the devastating explosion. The group was accompanied by four faculty members. Bodies of five of the students arrived at the Pune airport on 26 August afternoon and were received at the airport by a large crowd.

Responsibility
Central security agencies said that the banned Harkat-ul-Jehadi Islami (Huji) militant outfit from Bangladesh was possibly behind the twin blasts. It was suspected that Shahid and Bilal or Sahid Ilyas Bilal, who were the masterminds of the Mecca masjid blast were also behind Saturday's explosion. Shahid is reported to be in Karachi, Pakistan, and is instrumental in recruiting people for arms training from Hyderabad. Shahid Ilyas Bilal, who is also linked to the Mecca Masjid attacks is a high-ranking Lashkar-e-Taiba operative who has lately been working with Huji.

Madhukar Gupta, Union Home Secretary, has said that security agencies and state police suspect Lashkar-e-Toiba or Jaish-e-Mohammed. Shivraj Patil Minister for Home Affairs, specified terror groups based in Pakistan and Bangladesh were involved in the attacks.

On 26 August, Foreign Affairs Adviser of Bangladesh Iftekhar Ahmed Chowdhury described claims linking Bangladesh with the bombings as 'baseless'.

On 27 August, the Hyderabad police released the news that the bombs were constructed from Neogel-90, an ammonium nitrate-based explosive used commercially in road construction. The Telegraph reported that this caused suspicion to be 'divided' between the Huji, which is known to have used Neogel in the past, and Naxalite organisations from the interior of Andhra Pradesh, who have been "planning retaliation for the state government's hot-pursuit campaign"; Neogel-90 has not previously been used illegally in India, but has been seized in the past from Naxalite groups in Kerala and Nepal.

Investigations
Three people were picked up for questioning regarding the blast. Among them were a cycle shop owner, from Bibinagar, about 25 kilometres (16 mi) from Hyderabad. It is alleged that he supplied the steel balls used in the bombs.

A group of four individuals was taken for questioning, the Pioneer notes:

Reactions 

President Pratibha Patil, Vice-President Hamid Ansari and Prime Minister Manmohan Singh condemned the Hyderabad blasts and expressed shock over the loss of innocent lives.

In the light of the twin bomb blasts in Hyderabad, eminent forensic scientist P. Chandra Sekharan has urged the Government of India to establish a "National Explosives Control Bureau (NECB)" on the lines of the Narcotics Control Bureau.

References

External links
 Mumbai blast of 7/11

Explosions in 2007
21st-century mass murder in India
Mass murder in 2007
Terrorist incidents in India in 2007
Improvised explosive device bombings in India
History of Hyderabad, India
History of Andhra Pradesh (1947–2014)
Islamic terrorism in India
Islamic terrorist incidents in 2007
Crime in Hyderabad, India
Attacks on restaurants in Asia
August 2007 events in India
Attacks on buildings and structures in India
Building bombings in India